Phantom Birds is the eighth studio album by English comedian and musician Matt Berry, released in September 2020 by Acid Jazz Records.

Track listing

Personnel
 Matt Berry - vocals, acoustic guitar, 12-string guitar, electric guitar, bass guitar, piano, organ, Mellotron, harmonica, songwriting, production, engineering
 BJ Cole - pedal steel guitar
 Craig Blundell - drums

Charts

References

2020 albums
Matt Berry albums
Acid Jazz Records albums